Results May Vary is the fourth studio album by American rap rock band Limp Bizkit, released on September 23, 2003, through Flip and Interscope Records. It is the band's only release under the sole-leadership of vocalist Fred Durst after the temporary departure of guitarist Wes Borland, who left in 2001. Guitarist Mike Smith of Snot was brought in to replace Borland, although his time with the band was brief, and Durst along with a number of guests ended up handling the majority of the album's guitar work.

The album differed from Limp Bizkit's established sound up until that point; although the album still featured elements of hip hop and nu metal, it also branched out into other musical styles, including alternative rock, acoustic, funk, jazz, and emo. It also featured less rapping and more introspective lyrics related to heartbreak, bullying, and self-pity. An alleged affair with Britney Spears by Durst (denied by Spears) during collaborating sessions for her 2003 album In the Zone and resulting rejection by Spears was also cited as an inspiration for some of the album's material. To promote the album, music videos featuring high-profile actors were created for "Eat You Alive" and a cover of The Who's "Behind Blue Eyes"; the former featuring Thora Birch and Bill Paxton and the latter featuring Halle Berry.

Upon its release, Results May Vary peaked at number 3 on the US Billboard 200, selling at least 325,000 copies in its first week of sales. While the album still eventually went platinum, both the debut and lifetime sales were still well below prior albums Significant Other (1999) and Chocolate Starfish and the Hot Dog Flavored Water (2000). Results May Vary sold at least 1.3 million copies in the United States, and received mainly negative critical reception as well. Results May Vary was Limp Bizkit's last studio album released before they went on hiatus for three years, starting from 2006 to 2009.

Background and recording

In October 2001, Fred Durst posted on the band's website: "Limp Bizkit and Wes Borland have amicably decided to part ways. Both Limp Bizkit and Borland will continue to pursue their respective musical careers. Both wish each other the best of luck in all future endeavors." Borland explained why he left Limp Bizkit; he said: "I could have probably gone on and still played the part of the guitar player of Limp Bizkit, but musically I was kind of bored. If I was to continue, it would have been about the money and not about the true music, and I don't want to lie to myself, or to them or to fans of Limp Bizkit."

According to Durst, Limp Bizkit would "comb the world for the illest guitar player known to man" to replace Borland. After holding a nationwide audition for a new guitarist, "Put Your Guitar Where Your Mouth Is", the band recorded with Snot guitarist Mike Smith. "Mike brought in a breath of fresh air," Durst said. "Creatively, it fit like a glove. It made life easier and more positive. It made us look forward to getting together as a band so much more. The positive effect he had on me just made the whole experience of Limp Bizkit feel like a brand-new entity." Before Smith replaced Borland, Durst originally attempted to write and play a great deal of the guitar tracks before resorting to hire session musician; Elvis Baskette to help with writing and recording the majority of the album. Jon Wiederhorn of MTV wrote, "Limp Bizkit jammed with four finalists after their much-publicized guitarist audition tour, but now it looks like Fred Durst might be taking a cue from his Puddle of Mudd pal Wes Scantlin and handling both vocal and guitar duties himself."

After a later falling-out with Smith, Durst told a fansite: "We are the type of people that stay true to our family and our instincts and at any moment will act on intuition as a whole. Mike wasn't the guy. We had fun playing with him but always knew, in the back of our minds, that he wasn't where we needed him to be mentally." Limp Bizkit scrapped many of Smith's sessions, recording another album that was also scrapped.

Before the introduction of Results May Vary track listing, Page Hamilton of Helmet and Rivers Cuomo of Weezer recorded songs with Limp Bizkit for the album; Al Jourgensen of Ministry also joined the band in the studio. The contributions of all three were omitted from the finished album. Bubba Sparxxx joined Durst in a Los Angeles studio, but his contributions also did not make the album. Durst wrote over 30 songs with Limp Bizkit drummer John Otto and the band's bassist, Sam Rivers. During production of Results May Vary, Durst listened to the Cure, Patsy Cline, Mazzy Star and classical music.

Title
During production, the album's title changed from Bipolar to Panty Sniffer, and then to Results May Vary. Other working titles were Less Is More, Fetus More, Surrender and The Search for Teddy Swoes. The finished product assembled songs from a number of sessions. On August 20, 2003, Fred Durst posted on the Limp Bizkit website: "The album title is Results May Vary. Like a prescription drug, each persons reaction to the ingredients will be different."

Music and lyrics

Results May Vary was recorded under the leadership of Durst, who influenced a direction differing from Limp Bizkit's established sound. Although the album features elements of  rap metal and rap rock, it is noted for music experimenting with other genres: psychedelia, alternative rock, hard rock, jazz, acoustic and funk. Results May Vary, more melodic than previous Limp Bizkit albums, has been compared to John Mayer, Bon Jovi, Primus, Linkin Park, Staind and Jane's Addiction (including the Jane's Addiction's album Nothing's Shocking). With a change in the band's sound, Results May Vary has less rapping, more singing and more melody (including power ballads) than previous Limp Bizkit albums. The Observer called the album Limp Bizkit's "safest, most pedestrian-sounding record yet", and Joe D'Angelo of MTV described the album as the band's "most personal album by far". According to D'Angelo, a third of the album's content shows Durst "having actual feelings other than rage, angst and conceit under his omnipresent ball cap." Durst described Results May Vary as "more sad, more deep, drone-y", and the album demonstrates his "milder, more sensitive streak". Although the songs on Results May Vary are emotional and expressive, except for "Eat You Alive", screaming is largely absent.

Durst's controversy with Britney Spears provided lyrical inspiration for Results May Vary. There were rumors that Durst and Spears were in a relationship. Durst wrote three songs for Spears' 2003 album In the Zone. Durst and Spears worked on those songs in a studio. After Spears denied the relationship, Durst refused to allow those three songs to appear on Spears' 2003 album In the Zone. Results May Vary features a cover of The Who's "Behind Blue Eyes" with a Speak & Spell during the song's bridge. "Gimme the Mic" includes lyrics from the Beastie Boys' "Pass the Mic" and Eric B. & Rakim's "Microphone Fiend", and "Let Me Down" samples Steve Miller's "Take the Money and Run". "Head for the Barricade" borrows from the song "Stick 'Em" by the Fat Boys. "Phenomenon" borrows the line, "Once again back it's the incredible", from "Bring the Noise" by Public Enemy. The album demonstrates Limp Bizkit's gloomy side, with more-serious, less-confident lyrics than previous songs. Lyrical topics include bullying, Durst's past, self-pity, betrayal, childhood pain, heartbreak, feeling misunderstood, love and Durst's views on MTV and radio. About "Down Another Day", Joe D'Angelo of MTV found it difficult to believe that lyrics that were similar to Mayer's could come from Durst, whom, according to D'Angelo, had recently "likened himself to a chainsaw and threatened to skin your ass raw". "Eat You Alive" was reportedly about Britney Spears (rumored to be involved with Durst) or Angelina Jolie (whom Durst admired). According to Durst, "The scream in 'Eat You Alive' is like an animalistic, sexual, crazy, primitive roar", and the desire which came with this behavior. Durst said that "Just Drop Dead" was not (as had been speculated) about Britney Spears, but was inspired by his experience with her and other women. Also, Durst said that "Just Drop Dead" is "about a girl who acts like a whore". According to Durst, "'Underneath the Gun' is about suicide and the struggle you can have when ending your life becomes an option".

Commercial performance

Promotion

To promote Results May Vary, Durst filmed music videos for "Eat You Alive" and "Behind Blue Eyes" featuring Thora Birch and Halle Berry, respectively. The video for "Eat You Alive" appeared on MTV before Results May Vary was released, and the album was featured on Total Request Live. Limp Bizkit were going to record a music video for Results May Vary song "Build a Bridge". However, no music video for "Build a Bridge" was recorded. Limp Bizkit performed "Crack Addict" and "Rollin'" during WrestleMania XIX with guitarists Mike Smith and Brian Welch, and "Crack Addict" was played on television commercials for the event. Although "Crack Addict" was the planned first single from Results May Vary, the song was omitted from the album.

Released on September 23, 2003, Results May Vary peaked at number three on the Billboard 200 with sales of at least 325,000 copies in its first week of being released, ending Limp Bizkit's number-one streak on the chart. This would also be Limp Bizkit's 3rd and final album to enter the Top 10 of the Billboard 200.  In three weeks of being released, the album had sold at least 500,000 copies. After thirteen weeks, Results May Vary sold at least 1,000,000 copies. Results May Vary was certified platinum by the Recording Industry Association of America (RIAA) on June 3, 2008 and was certified gold by the British Phonographic Industry (BPI) on October 10, 2003. Results May Vary had sales of 1,337,356 copies in the United States. The album's cover of "Behind Blue Eyes" peaked at number 71 on the Billboard Hot 100, peaked at number 25 on the Mainstream Top 40 chart, and was certified gold by the RIAA on January 26, 2005. "Eat You Alive" peaked at number 16 on the Mainstream Rock chart and number 20 on the Modern Rock Tracks chart, and "Almost Over" peaked at number 33 on the Mainstream Rock chart, despite not receiving a single release. Results May Vary had less mainstream success than previous Limp Bizkit albums such as Significant Other and Chocolate Starfish and the Hot Dog Flavored Water.

Touring
After the release of Results May Vary, Limp Bizkit joined the band Korn on a tour called the Back 2 Basics Tour. The Back 2 Basics Tour, which was sponsored by Xbox, was scheduled for November 2003. However, during a concert at New York's Hammerstein Ballroom, Durst was hit by an object thrown from the crowd. Durst finished the remaining two songs of Limp Bizkit's set and after the concert, Durst had seven stitches administered by a private physician. During the end of 2003, Limp Bizkit cancelled their tour dates in Southeast Asia after there was a United States Department of State warning of increased security threats abroad. Limp Bizkit planned to play shows in Bali, Bangkok and Manila. However, after a terrorist bombing in Istanbul, Turkey occurred, the United States Department of State issued a travel advisory, and Limp Bizkit cancelled the shows in Southeast Asia. Although they did not perform in Southeast Asia, Limp Bizkit did perform in South Korea and Japan. In January 2004, there were rumors that Limp Bizkit were going to tour with the rock band Kiss, although the band was unable to, citing scheduling conflicts.

Critical reception

Critical reception of Results May Vary was mainly negative. The album holds a score of 33 out of 100 on Metacritic, indicating "generally unfavorable reviews". This is the third lowest score on Metacritic, above The Bloodhound Gang's Hefty Fine and Kevin Federline's album Playing with Fire. According to AllMusic reviewer Stephen Thomas Erlewine, "the music has no melody, hooks, or energy, [and] all attention is focused on the clown jumping up and down and screaming in front, and long before the record is over, you're left wondering, how the hell did he ever get to put this mess out?". In a review of Limp Bizkit's Greatest Hitz compilation, Erlewine called "Behind Blue Eyes" the worst in the band's "never-ending series of embarrassing covers". Caroline Sullivan of The Guardian wrote, "Durst's problems are ever-present - and does anybody still care?". Stylus criticized Results May Vary, calling it "an album that can only be described as abysmal". Rob O'Connor of Yahoo! Launch also criticized Results May Vary: "No, Fred, the results don't vary. The results are consistent throughout your new album—consistently crappy." Kitty Empire of The Guardian wrote, "Limp Bizkit have decided to expose their tender side. They really shouldn't have bothered [...] having seen Limp Bizkit's 'other side', you want the old, unapologetic, meathead version back". Scott Mervis of the Pittsburgh Post-Gazette also criticized Results May Vary: "Results May Vary has a few highlights — 'Almost Over' (very Everlast) and 'Phenomenon' (very Primus) — but way too few to justify all the time and energy spent".

Although Results May Vary received primarily negative reviews, according to Spin, the album "isn't all that horrible". Some others were not so negative towards Results May Vary. Tom Day of MusicOMH wrote, "Ultimately, this album is neither crap nor blindingly good, and results do indeed vary". The Sun-Sentinel gave Results May Vary a positive review, calling Lethal's work "phenomenal", and praising "Behind Blue Eyes" and the soft-to-heavy progression of "Build a Bridge". Steve Appleford of the Chicago Tribune gave Results May Vary a mixed review, writing: "The music achieves some surprising sophistication with new textures both acoustic and electronic. Durst also is not so obnoxious nearly so often; at the same time, his songs too often lack the harsh melodic spark that once turned his ravings into pop hits".

Track listing

Note
Red Light-Green Light ends at 3:54, while Behind Blue Eyes ends at 4:26.

Personnel

Limp Bizkit

DJ Lethal – turntables, keyboards, samples,programming, sound development
Fred Durst – vocals, concept, art direction,cover design, guitar, photography, producer, composer, lyrics
John Otto – drums, percussion, beats
Sam Rivers – bass, guitar
Mike Smith – guitar Tracks 1-3, 14

Artwork

Cory Durst – photography
Jim Marshall – photography

Composers and additional musicians

Michael "Elvis" Baskette – guitar Tracks 4-13
Snoop Dogg – vocals on"Red Light–Green Light", lyrics
Randy Pereira – guitar on"Behind Blue Eyes"
Arthur Baker – composer
Roger Ball – composer
Eric Barrier – composer

Molly Duncan – composer
William Griffin – composer
Prince Markie Dee – composer
John Robie – composer
Pete Townshend – composer
Ellis Williams – composer

Production and assistance

J.D. Andrew – assistant
Michael "Elvis" Baskette – engineer
Billy Bowers – engineer
Jason Carson – engineer
Sergio Chavez – assistant
Jason Dale – engineer
Terry Date – engineer, producer
Cory Durst – photography
Neal Ferrazzani – assistant
Dave Holdredge – digital editing, engineer
Brian Humphrey – assistant
Jun Ishizeki – assistant
Aaron Lepley – assistant

Stephen Marcussen – mastering
John Morrical – assistant
Brendan O'Brien – mixing
Zack Odom – assistant
Michael Patterson – mixing
Steve Robillard – assistant
Rick Rubin – producer
Andrew Scheps – engineer
Jordan Schur – executive producer
Jason Spears – assistant
Mark Valentine – assistant
Stewart Whitmore – digital editing
Ulrich Wild – engineer
|}

Charts

Weekly charts

Year-end charts

Certifications

References
Credited as simply "Limp Bizkit".

External links

Limp Bizkit albums
Rap rock albums by American artists
Alternative rock albums by American artists
2003 albums
Albums produced by Fred Durst
Albums produced by Rick Rubin
Flip Records (1994) albums
Albums produced by Terry Date